Sibeh (also Romanized as Sībeh) is a village in Ashiyan Rural District, in the Central District of Lenjan County, Isfahan Province, Iran. At the 2006 census, its population was 112, in 29 families.

References 

Populated places in Lenjan County